Senator Christensen may refer to:

Allen M. Christensen (born 1946), Utah State Senate
Earl Christensen (1919–2015), Wyoming State Senate
Leland Christensen (born 1959), Wyoming State Senate
Mark R. Christensen (born 1962), Nebraska State Senate